Johnson-Laird may refer to:

 Johnson-Laird Inc.
 Andy Johnson-Laird
 Philip Johnson-Laird